Mine Kawakami (born September 7, 1969) (Shōwa 44) is a Japanese pianist and composer.

Biography 
Mine Kawakami was born in the town of Nagakute, Japan in 1969. She started playing piano at age 3. She is entitled in music by High School Aichi Prefectural Meiwa and graduated from the Hochschule für Musik in Munich and the Madrid Royal Conservatory. As a classical musician, she has performed on the five continents, organized by foundations such as YAMAHA, NHK (Japan Broadcasting Corporation), Japan Foundation, SEEI, Embassy of Spain in Japan or the Ministry of Foreign Affairs of Japan. She has the awards of Radio Nagoya (1986) and the Munich Conservatory Competition (1990).

However, her formation in cultured tradition has been gradually approaching, without setting any barriers, different styles and aesthetics. These include traditional Japanese music, reflections from impressionism and neoclassicism, Latin jazz and Cuban rhythms. In 1996, she began her career as a composer.

Past projects include the two-piano concert with Chucho Valdés in Teatro Amadeo Roldan in Havana, Cuba (2004). In 2005, Kawakami was the pianist and official composer of the World Expo 2005 in Aichi (Japan), in 2008 she performed "Los Conciertos del Sueño" in Spain, an experimental proposal born in Japan, which approached and emphasized concepts of musical therapy. In 2013, Mine Kawakami was commissioned to compose the Sonata samurai in cultural events organized to commemorate the "Dual Year Spain – Japan", premiering this composition on June 11 at the Teatro Real in Madrid, in the presence of the Prince and Princess of Spain and the Prince of Japan, Naruhito. On March 11, 2014, played inside the Cathedral of Córdoba a unique concert that gathered more than 1,400 people.

In the words of Mine "The piano can express infinite number of possible sounds, rhythms and tones. I want my compositions and my playing forward so you might be touching the trees in the jungle, the sound of the wind or the voice of the earth."

Discography 
 In LatinAmerica (2004)
 In The Forest (2006)
 Kaori (2010)
 O meu caminho (2011)
 El piano durmiente (2012)
 Sonata samurái (2013)
 Samurai 1613 (2015)
Nostalghia-Kiyomizu- (2017)
NHK Radio Shinya Bin -Piano ga Kanaderu 72 kou- (2017)
Yamato Amadera Shojin Nikki Original Soundtrack (2019)
Pilgrim (2019)
Sky Blue (2019)
Christmas of Mine (2019)
Neko no Shippo Kaeru no Te (2020)

Soundtracks 
 Morizo to Kikoro (2005). 4 chapters.
 Kamataki (2006). Film directed by Claude Gagnon. Theme: "Como si fuera una cancion" (original of Victor Fonseca, musical arrangement & piano by Mine Kawakami)
 Neko no shippo Kaeru note (2010). 3 chapters.
 El jardín de las cuatro estaciones (2013). Film based on the life of Venetia Stanley-Smith.
 Anime time of adult women (2013). 4 chapters.

Concerts

References

External links 
 http://www.minekawakami.com.
 https://web.archive.org/web/20140301031323/http://minekawakami.wordpress.com/
 https://www.facebook.com/Minekawakami

1969 births
20th-century classical composers
20th-century classical pianists
20th-century Japanese composers
20th-century women composers
21st-century classical composers
21st-century classical pianists
21st-century Japanese composers
21st-century women composers
Japanese classical composers
Japanese classical pianists
Japanese women pianists
Japanese women classical composers
Living people
Women classical pianists
21st-century Japanese women musicians
20th-century women pianists
21st-century women pianists